ExamDiff Pro is a commercial software utility for visual file and directory comparison, for Microsoft Windows.

ExamDiff Pro has a double-pane view that allows side-by-side comparisons, with color-coded line numbers indicating whether each line is added, deleted, or changed. ExamDiff Pro can compare text and binary files, and directories.

Features
 Comparison of text files, binary files, and directories
 Difference highlighting to the level of lines, words or characters.
 Syntax highlighting
 Fuzzy line matching
 Ability to recognize moved text blocks
 Manual synchronization
 Shell integration in 32-bit and 64-bit Windows
 File editing within file comparison panes
 Support for copying, renaming, and deleting files or directories
 Unix, HTML, and printed diff reports
 Simple and regular expression search
 Extensive command line interface
 Ability to ignore capitalization, white space, and comments
 Word wrapping
 Plug-in support
 Drag and drop support
 Creation of directory snapshots for later comparison
 Unicode support
 XML support

ExamDiff
ExamDiff, from the same company, is a freeware program that compares text files.

See also
Diff
Comparison of file comparison tools

References

External links
ExamDiff Pro
ExamDiff

Windows-only software
File comparison tools